Granny Alina (died 1969) was the foster grandmother of Gabriel Louis Duval, who claimed in his 2004 book A Princess in the Family that she might have been Grand Duchess Anastasia Nikolaevna of Russia. (however photos of Granny Alina depict her looking like an older version of Grand Duchess Maria Nikolaevna of Russia.) According to Duval, Granny Alina married a man named Frank Antonowitz and moved to South Africa, where they started a farrier business together. After Frank's death, she began a relationship with a Greek man named Harry Karadimas, with whom she shared a home. She lived with Duval's family from 1954 until her death in 1969.

In his book, Duval claimed that Granny Alina told him she was a princess, that her family had been murdered during the Russian Revolution, and that she had been rescued. She did not want to talk about the rescue for fear of being sent back to Russia. Duval had her grave exhumed, but her remains were too decomposed to produce an accurate DNA profile. The story attracted some television news coverage in Australia and in the United States.

See also
Romanov impostors

Notes

1969 deaths
Romanov impostors
Year of birth missing
Grand Duchess Anastasia Nikolaevna of Russia